Gornji Kneginec is a village and municipality in Croatia in Varaždin County.

According to the 2021 census, there are 4,920 inhabitants, in the following settlements:
 Donji Kneginec, population 650
 Gornji Kneginec, population 1,437
 Lužan Biškupečki, population 359
 Turčin, population 811
 Varaždin Breg, population 1,663

The absolute majority of population are Croats.

The municipality is home to a monument to Croatian soldiers killed by Yugoslav Partisans in World War II and it aftermath.

References

External links
 Gornji Kneginec 

Municipalities of Croatia
Populated places in Varaždin County